{{Infobox person
| name               = Ben Stassen
| image              = 
| image_size         = 
| alt                = 
| caption            = 
| birth_name         = 
| birth_date         = 1959(age 62-63)
| birth_place        = Aubel, Belgium
| death_date         = 
| death_place        = 
| nationality        = Belgian
| other_names        = 
| known_for          = Fly Me to the Moon  A Turtle's Tale: Sammy's Adventures  A Turtle's Tale 2: Sammy's Escape from Paradise  The House of Magic  Robinson Crusoe  The Son of Bigfoot  The Queen's Corgi  Bigfoot Family| occupation         = Film director, film producer
| years_active       = 1988–present
}}

Ben Stassen is a Belgian film director, producer, and screenwriter. He is best known for directing and producing several computer-animated films such as A Turtle's Tale: Sammy's Adventures (2010), Robinson Crusoe (2016), and The Queen's Corgi (2019).

Career
Stassen founded nWave Pictures in 1994, producing CG ride films including Devil's Mine. Starting in 1997, Stassen began focusing on large-format films, directing Thrill Ride: The Science of Fun and Alien Adventure. In the late 1990s, Stassen directed a succession of 3-D large-format films, including Encounter in the Third Dimension and Haunted Castle.

In 2005, Stassen produced and directed Wild Safari 3D, the first 3-D wildlife film for the giant screen.

Stassen's first feature-length animated film, Fly Me to the Moon, was released in North America on 15 August 2008 on both regular-size and IMAX screens, exclusively in 3-D. According to nWave, Fly Me to the Moon was the first animated film to be designed, created, and released solely in 3-D. The film was originally announced for the spring or summer of 2007.

On 7 May 2008, nWave announced that its next feature-length animated film would be called Around the World in 50 Years and that it too would be directed by Stassen. It was released in 2010 as A Turtle's Tale: Sammy's Adventures. Further animated features directed or co-directed by Stassen include A Turtle's Tale 2: Sammy's Escape from Paradise (2012), The House of Magic (2013), The Wild Life (2016) and The Son of Bigfoot (2017).

Stassen was also involved in the production of several films directed by Croatian film director Krsto Papić, most notably My Uncle's Legacy.The Queen's Corgi, the 7th feature animated project from Stassen, was released in 2019.

Budgeted at more than $20 million, “Corgi” follows the adventure of Rex, the British monarch's most beloved dog, who is tricked into leaving his mistress in search for adventure. But soon his escapade takes an unexpected turn as he stumbles across a fight club with dogs of all kinds confronting each other. During his epic journey to return to Buckingham Palace, Rex falls in love and discovers his true self.

Stassen and nWave Pictures released Bigfoot Family on February 28/2021 on the streaming website Netflix (in the USA, Canada, New Zealand, and the UK). And it is the best watched European film on Netflix. And was on number one on Netflix as the best-watched film in that week.

Sony Pictures International Productions (SPIP) is joining forces with Stassen and his producing partner Matthieu Zeller on “Chickenhare and the Hamster of Darkness,” an ambitious 3D-animated adventure film based on the Dark Horse comics (release date 2022).

Filmography
Short films 
 Special Effects: Anything Can Happen (1996)
 Thrill Ride: The Science of Fun (1997)
 Alien Adventure (1999)
 Encounter in the Third Dimension (1999)
 Haunted Castle (2001)
 SOS Planet (2002)
 Misadventures in 3D (2003)
 Haunted House (2004)
 Wild Safari 3D (2005)
 African Adventure: Safari in the Okavango (2007)
 Pirate Story (2011)

Feature films
 Fly Me to the Moon (2008)
 A Turtle's Tale: Sammy's Adventures (2010)
 A Turtle's Tale 2: Sammy's Escape from Paradise (2012)
 The House of Magic (2013)
 Robinson Crusoe (2016) (Released as The Wild Life in North America.)
 The Son of Bigfoot (2017)
 The Queen's Corgi (2019)
 Bigfoot Family (2020)
 Chickenhare and the Hamster of Darkness'' (2022)

References

External links 

Belgian film directors
Belgian film producers
Belgian animated film producers
Belgian animated film directors
Belgian screenwriters
Place of birth missing (living people)
Belgian animators
Living people
1959 births